Justin Leonard Löwe (born 30 December 1998) is a German professional footballer who most recently played as a midfielder for Dynamo Dresden.

Career
Löwe made his professional debut for Dynamo Dresden in the 2. Bundesliga on 2 November 2018, coming on as a substitute in the 90+2nd minute for Aias Aosman in the 3–1 home win against SV Sandhausen.

References

External links
 
 

1998 births
Living people
German footballers
Association football midfielders
2. Bundesliga players
Regionalliga players
Dynamo Dresden players
FC Oberlausitz Neugersdorf players